Sandvik is a Swedish company.

Sandvik may also refer to:

 Sandvik (surname)
 Sandvík, a village in the Faroe Islands
 Sandvik Church, a church in Norway

See also
 
 Sandvika (disambiguation)